Yuri Aleksandrovich Nyrkov (June 29, 1924, Vyshny Volochyok, Russian SFSR – December 20, 2005, Moscow) was a Soviet football player.

Honours
 Soviet Top League winner: 1948, 1950, 1951.
 Soviet Cup winner: 1948, 1951.

International career
Nyrkov made his debut for USSR on July 15, 1952, in an Olympics game against Bulgaria.

Personal
He served in the army in World War II. After his retirement from soccer he returned to service and eventually reached the rank of Major General.

References

External links
  Profile

1924 births
2005 deaths
People from Vyshny Volochyok
Russian footballers
Soviet footballers
Soviet Union international footballers
Soviet Top League players
PFC CSKA Moscow players
Olympic footballers of the Soviet Union
Footballers at the 1952 Summer Olympics
Soviet military personnel of World War II
Soviet major generals
Burials in Troyekurovskoye Cemetery

Association football defenders
Sportspeople from Tver Oblast